Aspis Xanthi F.C. is a Greek football club, based in Xanthi, Xanthi.

Honours

Domestic
 Greek Football Amateur Cup Winners: 1
 1991-92
 Xanthi FCA Champions: 2
 1987-88, 2017-18
 Xanthi FCA Cup Winners: 7
 1978-79, 1979-80, 1980-81, 1981-82, 1988-89, 1991-92, 2001-02

References 

Xanthi
Football clubs in Eastern Macedonia and Thrace
Association football clubs established in 1922
1922 establishments in Greece
Gamma Ethniki clubs